Alexander (Zander) Blewett III (born 1945) is a Montana personal injury lawyer based out of Great Falls, Montana. The University of Montana School of Law is named for Blewett. He is the head partner in the Hoyt and Blewett PLLC, a personal injury law firm.

Legal career
Alexander (Zander) Blewett III is a member of the Inner Circle of Advocates, a group of personal injury lawyers in the United States.

Seltzer vs. Morton 
Blewett is most noted for the $21.4 million malicious prosecution and abuse of process verdict he obtained against Gibson, Dunn & Crutcher, one of the most high powered law firms in the world, in the case of Seltzer v. Morton.  The $21.4 million verdict in actual and punitive damages was one of the largest in the country in 2005 and attracted attention from the Wall Street Journal and other national publications. On appeal the Montana Supreme Court, 154 P.3d 561 (Mont. 2007), upheld $9.9 million of the jury's punitive damage award against Gibson Dunn and accused the firm of engaging in "legal thuggery."

Vangsnes vs. North American Mission Board of the Southern Baptist Convention Inc.
In 2015, Blewett obtained a $26 million settlement on behalf of a missionary who suffered a catastrophic brain injury in a car accident near Belgrade, Montana.

Philanthropy
On May 20, 2015, it was announced that Blewett donated $10 million to the University of Montana to rename its law school and create a consumer law and protection program. He funded the construction of the Hoyt and Blewett Court Room at the University of Montana Law School and provided $500,000 to Montana State University – Bozeman to improve facilities for its student-athletes.

Family politics
Blewett's son, father, and grandfather have all served in the Montana House of Representatives.  Blewett's father, Alex Blewett Jr., a  Republican from Great Falls, served in the Montana House of Representatives as a Republican in 1961 and 1963.  In 1963 he served as Republican Majority Leader of the State House.  In 1964, he unsuccessfully challenged Democratic incumbent Mike Mansfield for the U.S. Senate.  Blewett's Grandfather, Alexander Blewett Sr., a Republican from Butte, served in the Montana House of Representatives in 1931, 1943, 1945, 1947, and 1951.  Blewett's son, Anders Blewett, a Democrat from Great Falls, was elected to the Montana House of Representatives in 2008 and the Montana Senate in 2010.

References

External links
Hoyt and Blewett Law Firm homepage
Alexander Blewett III School of Law at the University of Montana)
 Legal Process As Extortion – The Ethics Scoreboard
 Lassoing a Longhorn (Painting)

1945 births
People from Great Falls, Montana
Living people
Montana lawyers
20th-century American lawyers
21st-century American lawyers
21st-century philanthropists
Philanthropists from Montana